Bulleyia is a genus of plants in the family Orchidaceae. It is either epiphytic or lithophitic, growing on tree branches or on rocks on steep hillsides. The genus is monotypic and represented only by Bulleyia yunnanensis, native to the Himalayas of Assam, Bhutan, eastern India and Yunnan.

References

Coelogyninae
Endemic orchids of China
Endangered plants
Orchids of China
Orchids of Yunnan
Orchids of India
Orchids of Assam
Flora of East Himalaya
Monotypic Epidendroideae genera
Taxonomy articles created by Polbot
Arethuseae genera